Ting Huang (Chinese: 黃婷, born May 13, 1977) is a lyricist, A&R, concert PR, lecturer and writer. She was born in Kaohsiung, Taiwan, and received BA in Foreign Languages and Literature from National Taiwan University (NTU), MA in Journalism from Marshall University and MA in Film Studies from Iowa State University. Due to her degrees, Ting also had several years of professional experiences in the film industry.

Career

Songwriter and A&R 
In 2004, Ting began her career in the Chinese music industry from joining the studio of Jonathan Lee as an A&R. To date, she has been serving as an A&R for over a decade and supervised music projects for over 20 artists. In 2005, Ting began writing lyrics. The first song she's written was “Yi Hou 以後” by Wakin Chau (from the album “Wakin in the Rain 雨人”), and the first song she published was “I Still Remember 我還記得” by Fish Leong (from the album “Silk Road of Love 絲路”). Later, she joined B'in Music and worked with artists including Fish Leong, Rene Liu, Yen-j, Della, etc. Ting had been Della's A&R for years and also written numerous songs for her, including “Unable To Guess 猜不透”, the hit that made it to the top of KKBox chart within a week in 2008. In 2015, Ting left B'in Music and founded Non-Stop Studio, managing music projects and concert PR for singers like Stefanie Sun, Fish Leong, Wakin Chau, Da-Yu Lo, etc.

Artistry

Early influences 
Tom Chang is an important figure for Ting as she claims herself to be Tom's hardcore fans. Tom also served as one of the major influences that led Ting to enter the Chinese music industry. She would regain that drive of moving forward through listening to Tom's songs. Another singer whom Ting likes is Bobby Chen. She also published a series of prose for him in 2005, “Hen Sheng Ge – Sheng Mi Sui Yue 恨昇歌 – 昇迷歲月”.

Mindset for songwriting 
Ting quoted Jonathan Lee's words at an interview, “Singing is like the extension of speech, the tone is very important. The songs that are selected into the album represent the speech and tone that the singer is going to portray. This decision-making process is fine art.” Under Lee's influence, Ting believes that if the singers read out the lyrics before recording, it'll be helpful for them to interpret the tone and think about how to perform the song.

On the other hand, Ting also thinks about the different backgrounds and personalities of every singer when she tailor make the lyrics. For example, when she was writing Stefanie Sun's lyrics, she would pay extra attention to the language context. As the language context between Singaporean Chinese is different from that of Greater China, Ting would incorporate both the singer's background and market demands when writing the songs. On top of that, Ting would also take the singer's personality into account. For example, Della's character is more straightforward, courageous, and refuses to show her vulnerability. Ting also incorporated the singer's personality into the style of the music and lyrics while writing the songs.

Style 
Ting has done many different genres of music before, including ballad, dance, rap, songs for commercials, and even songs for video games. Of the genres, ballad takes up about 70% of her work, as Ting is an expert in using straightforward and practical word choices to illustrate the emotional struggles in relationships. Ting believes that lyrics that move people are great lyrics, and has once stated in an interview, “whenever I write lyrics, there’s only one goal; that is, to make myself feel touched.”

Ting thinks that when writing lyrics for pop music, it's important to have the target audience and theme clear in mind. The point is to convey the emotions instead of going after embellished writing, as sometimes it's the colloquial and ordinary strings of words that can best touch the listeners. That was how Ting wrote “Unable To Guess 猜不透” by Della.

At the same time, Ting emphasizes on the match between lyrics and melody, and serving the purpose of the song. For example, the song “I Love Him我愛他” (performed by Della) was tailor made according to the storyline of the TV drama “Autumn's Concerto下一站，幸福”: “他的輕狂留在某一節車廂，地下鐵的風比回憶還重.” Also, the line “我愛他轟轟烈烈最瘋狂” has the onomatopoeia “轟轟烈烈”located right on where the melody is at its climax. This lyrics design matches and interacts perfectly with the melody flow, allowing listeners to immerse themselves into the song and in turn receive a stronger impact emotionally.

Works Produced

Lyrics 
Listing representative works in chronological order:

2019

2018

2017

2016

2015

2014

2013

2012

2011

2010

2009

2008

2007

2006

2005

Published Works

References 

Living people
1977 births
Taiwanese lyricists